The Arctic consists of land, internal waters, territorial seas, exclusive economic zones (EEZs) and international waters above the Arctic Circle (66 degrees 33 minutes North latitude). All land, internal waters, territorial seas and EEZs in the Arctic are under the jurisdiction of one of the eight Arctic coastal states: Canada, Denmark (via Greenland), Finland, Iceland, Norway, Russia, Sweden and the United States. International law regulates this area as with other portions of Earth.

Under international law, the North Pole and the region of the Arctic Ocean surrounding it are not owned by any country. The waters beyond the territorial seas and EEZs, that is, beyond  from the coastal states' baselines, are considered the "high seas" (i.e. international waters). The waters and sea bottom that is not confirmed to be extended continental shelf beyond the exclusive economic zones are considered to be the "heritage of all mankind." Fisheries in these waters can only be limited by international treaty and exploration and exploitation of mineral resources on and below the seabed in these areas is administered by the UN International Seabed Authority.

Upon ratification of the United Nations Convention on the Law of the Sea (UNCLOS), a country has a ten-year period to make claims to an extended continental shelf which, if validated, gives it exclusive rights to resources on or below the seabed of that extended shelf area. Norway, Russia, Canada, and Denmark launched projects to provide a basis for seabed claims on extended continental shelves beyond their exclusive economic zones. The United States has signed, but not yet ratified the UNCLOS.

The status of certain portions of the Arctic sea region is in dispute for various reasons. Canada, Denmark, Norway, Russia, and the United States all regard parts of the Arctic seas as national waters (territorial waters out to ) or internal waters. There also are disputes regarding what passages constitute international seaways and rights to passage along them. There was one single disputed piece of land in the Arctic—Hans Island—which was disputed until 2022 between Canada and Denmark because of its location in the middle of a strait.

North Pole and the Arctic Ocean

National sectors: 1925–2005
On April 15 the following year, the Presidium of the Supreme Soviet of the USSR declared the territory between two lines (32°04′35″E to 168°49′30″W) drawn from west of Murmansk to the North Pole and from the eastern Chukchi Peninsula to the North Pole to be Soviet territory. Norway (5°E to 35°E) made similar sector claims, as did the United States (170°W to 141°W), but that sector contained only a few islands, so the claim was not pressed. Denmark's sovereignty over all of Greenland was recognized by the United States in 1916 and by an international court in 1933. Denmark could also conceivably claim an Arctic sector (60°W to 10°W).

In the context of the Cold War, Canada sent Inuit families to the far north in the High Arctic relocation, partly to establish territoriality. The Canadian monarch, Queen Elizabeth II, accompanied by the Duke of Edinburgh, Prince Charles, and Princess Anne, undertook in 1970 a tour of Northern Canada, in part to demonstrate to an unconvinced American government and the Soviet Union that Canada had certain claim to its Arctic territories, which were strategic during the Cold War. In addition, Canada claims the water within the Canadian Arctic Archipelago as its own internal waters. The United States is one of the countries which does not recognize Canada's, or any other countries', Arctic archipelagic water claims and has allegedly sent nuclear submarines under the ice near Canadian islands without requesting permission.

Until 1999, the geographic North Pole (a non-dimensional dot) and the major part of the Arctic Ocean had been generally considered to comprise international space, including both the waters and the sea bottom. However, the adoption of the United Nations Convention on the Law of the Sea (UNCLOS) has prescribed a process which prompted several countries to submit claims or to reinforce pre-existing claims to portions of the seabed of the polar region.

Extended Continental Shelf Claims: 2006–present

Overview
As defined by the UNCLOS, states have ten years from the date of ratification to make claims to an extended continental shelf. They must present to the Commission on the Limits of the Continental Shelf, a UN body, geological evidence that their shelf effectively extends beyond the 200 nautical miles limit. The Commission does not define borders but merely judges the scientific validity of assertions and it is up to countries with rightful but overlapping claims to come to a settlement. On this basis, four of the five states fronting the Arctic Ocean – Canada, Denmark, Norway, and the Russian Federation – must have made any desired claims by 2013, 2014, 2006, and 2007 respectively.  Since the U.S. has yet to ratify the UNCLOS, the date for its submission is undetermined at this time.

Claims to extended continental shelves, if deemed valid, give the claimant state exclusive rights to the sea bottom and resources below the bottom.  Valid extended continental shelf claims do not and cannot extend a state's Exclusive Economic Zone (EEZ) since the EEZ is determined solely by drawing a  line using territorial sea baselines as their starting point. Press reports often confuse the facts and assert that extended continental shelf claims expand a state's EEZ thereby giving a state exclusive rights to resources not only on the sea bottom or below it, but also to those in the water column above it. The Arctic chart prepared by Durham University explicitly illustrates the extent of the uncontested Exclusive Economic Zones of the five states bordering the Arctic Ocean, and also the relatively small expanse of remaining "high seas" or totally international waters at the very North of the planet.

Specific nations

Canada

Canada ratified UNCLOS on 7 November 2003 and had through 2013 to file its claim to an extended continental shelf. , Canada had announced that it would file a claim which includes the North Pole. Canada planned to submit their claim to a portion of the Arctic continental shelf in 2018.

In response to the Russian Arktika 2007 expedition, Canada's Foreign Affairs Minister, Peter MacKay, said "[t]his is posturing. This is the true North, strong and free, and they're fooling themselves if they think dropping a flag on the ocean floor is going to change anything... This isn't the 14th or 15th century." In response, Sergey Lavrov, the Russian Minister of Foreign Affairs, stated "[w]hen pioneers reach a point hitherto unexplored by anybody, it is customary to leave flags there. Such was the case on the Moon, by the way... [W]e from the outset said that this expedition was part of the big work being carried out under the UN Convention on the Law of the Sea, within the international authority where Russia's claim to submerged ridges which we believe to be an extension of our shelf is being considered. We know that this has to be proved. The ground samples that were taken will serve the work to prepare that evidence."

On 25 September 2007, Prime Minister Stephen Harper said he was assured by Russian President Vladimir Putin that neither offence nor "violation of international understanding or any Canadian sovereignty" was intended. Harper promised to defend Canada's claimed sovereignty by building and operating up to eight Arctic patrol ships, a new army training centre in Resolute Bay, and the refurbishing of an existing deepwater port at a former mining site in Nanisivik.

Denmark

Denmark ratified UNCLOS on 16 November 2004 and had through 2014 to file a claim to an extended continental shelf.

The Kingdom of Denmark simultaneously declared that ratifying UNCLOS did not change Denmark's position that the Danish straits including the Great Belt, the Little Belt, and the Danish part of Øresund, formed on the foundation of the Copenhagen Treaty of 1857 are legally Danish territory, and – as set out in the treaty section of the United Nations Office of Legal Affairs – this should remain so. Consequently, Denmark considers the Copenhagen Convention to apply solely to the waterways through Denmark proper and not the North Atlantic.

Greenland, an autonomous territory within the Kingdom of Denmark, has the nearest coastline to the North Pole, and Denmark argues that the Lomonosov Ridge is in fact an extension of Greenland. Danish project included LORITA-1 expedition in April–May 2006 and included tectonic research during LOMROG expedition, which were part of the 2007–2008 International Polar Year program. It comprised the Swedish icebreaker Oden and Russian nuclear icebreaker NS 50 Let Pobedy. The latter led the expedition through the ice fields to the research location. Further efforts at geological study in the region were carried out by the LOMROG II expedition, which took place in 2009, and the LOMROG III expedition, launched in 2012.

On 14 December 2014 Denmark claimed an area of  extending from Greenland past the North Pole to the limits of the Russian Exclusive Economic Zone. Unlike the Russian claim which is generally limited to the Russia sector of the Arctic, the Danish Claim extends across the North Pole and into Russia's sector.

Norway
Norway ratified the UNCLOS on 24 June 1996 and had through 2006 to file a claim to an extended continental shelf.

On November 27, 2006, Norway made an official submission into the UN Commission on the Limits of the Continental Shelf in accordance with the United Nations Convention on the Law of the Sea (article 76, paragraph 8). There are provided arguments to extend the Norwegian seabed claim beyond the  EEZ in three areas of the northeastern Atlantic and the Arctic: the "Loop Hole" in the Barents Sea, the Western Nansen Basin in the Arctic Ocean, and the "Banana Hole" in the Norwegian Sea. The submission also states that an additional submission for continental shelf limits in other areas may be posted later.

Norway and Russia have ratified an agreement on the Barents Sea, ending a 40-year demarcation dispute.

Russia
Russia ratified the UNCLOS in 1997 and had through 2007 to file a claim to an extended continental shelf.

The Russian Federation is claiming a large extended continental shelf as far as the North Pole based on the Lomonosov Ridge and Mendeleyev Ridges within their Arctic sector. Moscow believes the eastern Lomonosov Ridge and the Mendeleyev Ridge are an extension of the Siberian continental shelf.  Until Denmark filed its claim, the Russian claim did not cross the Russia-US Arctic sector demarcation line, nor did it extend into the Arctic sector of any other Arctic coastal state.

On December 20, 2001, Russia made an official submission into the UN Commission on the Limits of the Continental Shelf in accordance with the United Nations Convention on the Law of the Sea (article 76, paragraph 8). In the document it is proposed to establish the outer limits of the continental shelf of Russia beyond the  Exclusive Economic Zone, but within the Russian Arctic sector. The territory claimed by Russia in the submission is a large portion of the Arctic within its sector, extending to but not beyond the geographic North Pole. One of the arguments was a statement that Lomonosov Ridge, an underwater mountain ridge passing near the Pole, and Mendeleev Ridge on the Russian side of the Pole are extensions of the Eurasian continent. In 2002 the UN Commission neither rejected nor accepted the Russian proposal, recommending additional research.

On August 2, 2007, a Russian expedition called Arktika 2007, composed of six explorers led by Artur Chilingarov, employing MIR submersibles, for the first time in history descended to the seabed at the North Pole. There they planted a Russian flag and took water and soil samples for analysis, continuing a mission to provide additional evidence related to the Russian extended continental shelf claim including the mineral riches of the Arctic. This was part of the ongoing 2007 Russian North Pole expedition within the program of the 2007–2008 International Polar Year.

The expedition aimed to establish that the eastern section of seabed passing close to the Pole, known as the Lomonosov and Mendeleyev Ridges, is in fact an extension of Russia's landmass. The expedition came as several countries are trying to extend their rights over sections of the Arctic Ocean floor. Both Norway and Denmark are carrying out surveys to this end. Vladimir Putin made a speech on a nuclear icebreaker on 3 May 2007, urging greater efforts to secure Russia's "strategic, economic, scientific and defense interests" in the Arctic.

In mid-September 2007, Russia's Natural Resources Ministry issued a statement:

Viktor Posyolov, an official with Russia's Agency for Management of Mineral Resources:

On August 4, 2015, Russia submitted additional data in support of its bid, containing new arguments based on "ample scientific data collected in years of Arctic research", for territories in the Arctic to the United Nations. Through this bid, Russia is claiming 1.2 million square kilometers (over 463,000 square miles) of Arctic sea shelf extending more than 350 nautical miles (about 650 kilometers) from the shore.
In February 2016 additional data was submitted by Russian Minister of Natural Resources and Environment Sergey Donskoy. After the expedition "Arktika 2007" Russian researchers collected new data reinforcing Russia's claim to part of the sea bottom beyond its uncontested 200-mile Exclusive Economic Zone (EEZ) within its Arctic sector, the North Pole area included. On August 9, 2016, the UN Commission on the Limits of the Continental Shelf began its review of the submission.

In 2021, the Russian Federation submitted several addenda to the CLCS extending the area claimed as part of its extended continental shelf. One submission extended its shelf claim across the Lomonosov Ridge up to the outer limit of Canada and Denmark's EEZ. This area overlaps completely with Danish and Canadian claims. Moscow also extended its shelf on the Gakkel Ridge, part of which overlaps with Danish claims.

United States
, the United States has not ratified the UN Convention on the Law of the Sea (UNCLOS). However, the United States points out that a coastal state's right to an extended continental shelf is well established in customary international law, so US rights do not depend on joining UNCLOS or making submissions to the CLCS.

In August 2007, an American Coast Guard icebreaker, the USCGC Healy, headed to the Arctic Ocean to map the sea floor off Alaska. Larry Mayer, director of the Center for Coastal and Ocean Mapping at the University of New Hampshire, stated the trip had been planned for months, having nothing to do with the Russians planting their flag. The purpose of the mapping work aboard the Healy is to determine the extent of the US continental shelf north of Alaska.

Future
It was stated by the Intergovernmental Panel on Climate Change on March 25, 2007, that riches are awaiting the shipping industry due to Arctic climate change. This economic sector could be transformed similar to the way the Middle East was by the Suez Canal in the 19th century. There will be a race among nations for oil, fish, diamonds and shipping routes, accelerated by the impact of global warming.
 However, much research commentary since 2008 has thrown cold water on narratives that the Arctic will experience a rush for resources that could lead to conflict between states.

The potential value of the North Pole and the surrounding area resides not so much in shipping itself but in the possibility that lucrative petroleum and natural gas reserves exist below the sea floor. Such reserves are known to exist under the Barents, Kara, and Beaufort Seas.  However, the vast majority of the Arctic known to contain gas and oil resources is already within uncontested EEZs.  While these EEZs leave much of the Central Arctic Ocean high seas, Canada, Russia, Denmark (via Greenland), and Norway have all announced extended continental shelf claims that cover almost the entire Arctic seabed. This would mean that legal rights to oil, gas, and other resources in and on the seabed would belong exclusively to the Arctic coastal states, which would have sole jurisdiction to manage their resources.

On September 14, 2007, the European Space Agency reported ice loss had opened up the Northwest Passage "for the first time since records began in 1978", and the extreme loss in 2007 rendered the passage "fully navigable". Further exploration for petroleum reserves elsewhere in the Arctic may now become more feasible, and the passage may become a regular channel of international shipping and commerce if Canada is not able to enforce its claim to it.

Foreign Ministers and other officials representing Canada, Denmark, Norway, Russia, and the United States met in Ilulissat, Greenland in May 2008, at the Arctic Ocean Conference and announced the Ilulissat Declaration.  Among other things the declaration stated that any demarcation issues in the Arctic should be resolved on a bilateral basis between contesting parties.

Hans Island

Hans Island is situated in the Nares Strait, a waterway that runs between Ellesmere Island (the northernmost part of Nunavut, Canada) and Greenland. The small uninhabited island, sized , was named for Greenlandic Arctic traveller Hans Hendrik.

In 1973, Canada and Denmark negotiated the geographic coordinates of the continental shelf, and settled on a delimitation treaty that was ratified by the United Nations on December 17, 1973, and has been in force since March 13, 1974. The treaty lists 127 points (by latitude and longitude) from Davis Strait to the end of Robeson Channel, where Nares Strait runs into Lincoln Sea; the border is defined by geodesic lines between these points. Hans Island is situated in the centre of this area.

Danish flags were planted on Hans Island in 1984, 1988, 1995 and 2003. The Canadian government formally protested these actions. In July 2005, former Canadian defence minister Bill Graham made an unannounced stop on Hans Island during a trip to the Arctic; this launched yet another diplomatic quarrel between the governments, and a truce was called that September.

Canada had claimed Hans Island was clearly in its territory, as topographic maps originally used in 1967 to determine the island's coordinates clearly showed the entire island on Canada's side of the delimitation line. However, federal officials reviewed the latest satellite imagery in July 2007, and conceded that the line went roughly through the middle of the island. This presently leaves ownership of the island disputed, with claims over fishing grounds and future access to the Northwest Passage possibly at stake as well.

As of April 2012, the governments of both countries are in negotiations which may ultimately result in the island being split almost precisely in half. The negotiations ended in November 2012 and gave a more exact border description, but did not solve the dispute over Hans Island. One possible resolution would be to treat the island as a condominium.

In 2022, Canada and Denmark resolved the dispute, establishing a land border through Hans Island.

Beaufort Sea

There is an ongoing dispute involving a wedge-shaped slice on the International Boundary in the Beaufort Sea, between the Canadian territory of Yukon and the American state of Alaska.

The Canadian position is that the maritime boundary should extend the land boundary in a straight line. The American position is that the maritime boundary should extend along a path equidistant from the coasts of the two nations. The disputed area may hold significant hydrocarbon reserves. The U.S. has already leased eight plots of the terrain below the water to search for and possibly bring to market oil reserves that may exist there. Canada has protested diplomatically in response. The boundary will likely effect the delimitation of the extended continental shelf in the Beaufort and Chukchi Seas. Ironically, each country's position within 200 nautical miles produces a line that favors the other state beyond 200 nautical miles.

No settlement has been reached to date.

On August 20, 2009 United States Secretary of Commerce Gary Locke announced a moratorium on fishing the Beaufort Sea north of Alaska, including the disputed waters.
Randy Boswell, of Canada.com wrote that the disputed area covered a  section of the Beaufort Sea (smaller than Israel, larger than El Salvador).
He wrote that Canada had filed a "diplomatic note" with the United States in April when the US first announced plans for the moratorium.

Northwest Passage

The legal status of the Northwest Passage is disputed: Canada considers it to be part of its historic internal waters. The United States and most maritime nations consider them to be an international strait, which means that foreign vessels have right of "transit passage". In such a regime, Canada would have the right to enact fishing and environmental regulation, and fiscal and smuggling laws, as well as laws intended for the safety of shipping, but not the right to close the passage. In addition, the environmental regulations allowed under the UNCLOS are not as robust as those allowed if the Northwest Passage is part of Canada's internal waters.

Northeast Passage

Russia considers portions of the Northern Sea Route, which encompasses only navigational routes through waters within Russia's Arctic EEZ east from Novaya Zemlya to the Bering Strait, to pass through Russian territorial and internal waters in the Kara, Vilkitskiy, and Sannikov Straits.

Arctic territories

Canada
Arctic Archipelago
Labrador
Northwest Territories
Nunavik
Nunavut
Yukon

Denmark
 Greenland

Iceland
 Grímsey

Norway
Bear Island
Finnmark
Jan Mayen
Svalbard

Russia
Arkhangelsk Oblast
Big Diomede (due to US Government definition of "Arctic", even though below Arctic Circle)
Chukotka Autonomous Okrug
Franz Josef Land
Krasnoyarsk Krai (majority of territory south of the Arctic Circle)
Murmansk Oblast
Nenets Autonomous Okrug
New Siberian Islands
Novaya Zemlya
Russian Arctic islands
Sakha Republic (most of the Republic south of the Arctic Circle)
Severnaya Zemlya (Russia)
Siberia (Russia)
Yamalo-Nenets Autonomous Okrug
Wrangel Island

United States
Alaska
Aleutian Islands (due to the U.S. Government definition of "Arctic", even though below the Arctic Circle)
Little Diomede Island (due to the U.S. Government definition of "Arctic", even though below the Arctic Circle)

Others
 Sápmi (Norway, Sweden, Finland and Russia)

See also

Arctic policy of Canada
United States Outer Continental Shelf
Outer Continental Shelf (in geography)
List of Russian explorers
Arctic policy of Russia
Arctic Cooperation and Politics
Norwegian continental shelf
Arctic Council
Canada–United States relations#Arctic disputes
Continental shelf of Russia
Territorial claims in Antarctica
Natural resources of the Arctic
Arctic resources race

References

Further reading
 Albert, Mathias, and Andreas Vasilache. "Governmentality of the Arctic as an international region." Cooperation and Conflict 53.1 (2018): 3-22. online
 Byers, Michael. Who owns the Arctic?: Understanding sovereignty disputes in the North (Douglas & McIntyre, 2010).
 Coates, Ken S., et al. Arctic front: defending Canada in the far north (Dundurn, 2010).
 Dodds, Klaus, and Mark Nuttall. The Arctic: What Everyone Needs to Know (Oxford University Press, 2019).
 Dodds, Klaus. The Antarctic: A Very Short Introduction (Oxford University Press, 2012).
 Griffiths, Franklyn, Rob Huebert, and P. Whitney Lackenbauer. Canada and the changing Arctic: Sovereignty, security, and stewardship (Wilfrid Laurier Univ. Press, 2011).
 Jensen, Leif Christian, and Geir Hønneland, eds. Handbook of the Politics of the Arctic (Edward Elgar Publishing, 2015).
 Keil, Kathrin. "The Arctic: A new region of conflict? The case of oil and gas." Cooperation and conflict 49.2 (2014): 162–190.
 Knecht, Sebastian, and Kathrin Keil. "Arctic geopolitics revisited: spatialising governance in the circumpolar North." The Polar Journal 3.1 (2013): 178–203.
 Ladies, Przemysław. "The United States and Canada towards Russian Arctic Policy: State of Play and Development Prospects." Society and Politics 2 (63) (2020): 73–103. online
 McCormack, Michael. "More than Words: Securitization and Policymaking in the Canadian Arctic under Stephen Harper," American Review of Canadian Studies (2020) 50#4 pp 436–460.
 Roberts, Kari. "Understanding Russia's security priorities in the Arctic: why Canada-Russia cooperation is still possible." Canadian Foreign Policy Journal (2020): 1–17. 
 Tamnes, Rolf, and Kristine Offerdal, eds. Geopolitics and Security in the Arctic: Regional dynamics in a global world (Routledge, 2014).
 Wallace, Ron R. "Canada and Russia in an Evolving Circumpolar Arctic." in The Palgrave Handbook of Arctic Policy and Politics (Palgrave Macmillan, Cham, 2020) pp. 351–372. online

External links
 
 
 
 Lecture by Donald M. McRae entitled Selected Issues Relating to the Arctic in the Lecture Series of the United Nations Audiovisual Library of International Law
 van Efferink, Leonhardt. Arctic Geopolitics 1 – oil and gas exploration, Northwest Passage, climate change, Arctic Geopolitics 2 – Russia's territorial claims, UNCLOS, the Lomonosov Ridge
 Frozen Assets archive
 The historical and legal background of Canada's Arctic claims (1952) Manuscript at Dartmouth College Library
 Territorial sovereignty in the Arctic (1947) Manuscript at Dartmouth College Library

Territorial disputes of Canada
Territorial disputes of Denmark
Territorial disputes of Norway
Territorial disputes of Russia
International territorial disputes of the United States
Multilateral relations of Russia
Canada–Russia relations
Canada–United States relations
Canada–United States border disputes
Russia–United States relations